Hiwatt is a British company that manufactures amplifiers for electric guitars and electric basses. Starting in the late 1960s, together with Marshall and Vox, Hiwatt contributed to the sonic image popularly termed "British sound".

History

Origins 
Hylight Electronics was the brainchild of British audio engineer David Reeves. He attended technical school in the late 1950s and did apprenticeships at Marconi Company and Mullard. While working his day job, young Reeves started working evenings in a small room over Plato Music on Crown Passage in Morden from 1964–1968. He fixed things at first, repairing hifi sets and televisions. It was during this time that he first conceived the idea to start his own company and invented the Hiwatt name.

In 1963, a local band's amplifier blew up, Dave Reeves said "I could build a better one than that" so he did. In early 1966, Reeves was made redundant from Mullard and used the £800 redundancy pay to pay to further develop his amps.

First amplifiers
The first amplifier models from 1964 used ultralinear taps for the screen grids. They were a split-chassis design 50 watt head with the control panel mounted on the top of the cabinet and a black and gold nameplate that featured small-case, cursive writing spelling out the name "hi-watt". The original HIWATTs owed more of their design and look to the VOX and SELMER counterparts of the day than to the classic look of the British guitar amplifier that HIWATT later embodied. Partridge transformers and Mullard valves were components of the Hiwatt recipe from the earliest days, in large part because Reeves was intimately familiar with them from working at Mullard.

Hylight and Sound City

Reeves started the Hylight company (the name came from an early 1960s band named "The Hylights" that a friend belonged to) and the name was registered in September 1966.

The first big order for amplifiers came from Ivor Arbiter's Sound City music store—these became the original Sound City amps. These amps (the so-called "Mark I") were his current amplifier design, re-badged with the Sound City name. He received 800-odd pounds for this batch of amps, but decided to focus on producing amps using the HIWATT name after this. Arbiter took Reeves to court afterwards saying they owned the design and Hylight was using it without permission. During the proceedings, Reeves pointed to the unused holes in the amp chassis and asked the Arbiter engineers what they were for—they couldn't answer, since they were just producing copies of the existing chassis that Reeves had originally designed. The case was decided in Reeves favour shortly thereafter.

Several units later, Reeves starting building amplifiers that more closely resembled the modern day HIWATT. Hylight Electronics originally sold direct to the musicians so that they could put the additional fees charged by distributors and music stores back into the growth of HIWATT. One of the earliest famous user was Glenn Cornick, then bassist of Jethro Tull. It was at his urging that the first 200-watt (and later 400-watt) amps were produced.  Pete Townshend of The Who also endorsed the brand. Reeves had made the Townshend connection earlier via the original Sound City heads that Pete used.

To subsidize its income at the time, HyLight Electronics also started manufacturing amplifiers under the SOLA SOUND name for Macari Ltd., one of the largest musical instrument distributors in the U.K. This arrangement only lasted for a short while as the popularity of the HIWATT amps increased.

Peter Webber was a former band road manager who promoted Reeve's amplifiers. Webber gave bands "hands-on" demos of the HIWATTS and promoted HIWATT's tonal capabilities and reliability. The bands initially trusted Peter for his reputation and knowledge.

With Peter Webber selling HIWATTS as quickly as the Hylight Electronics garage workshop could turn them out, The most critical and time-consuming stage in building the amps was in the wiring of the chassis (the trademark "right angles and neat bundles" internal wiring was being used in Hiwatts as early as 1969, before anyone external was brought into the picture.) In 1971, Reeves met with wirer Harry Joyce to refine the process. After some prodding by Reeves, Harry agreed to take on the chassis-wiring chores for Hylight Electronics on one condition: He insisted that they not be asked to produce more than forty units per month to maintain a high standard of quality control. Dave reluctantly agreed. Joyce's company wired many Hiwatts from this time until early 1984, when Biacrown could no longer pay its bills.

In Kingston upon Thames, Reeves found a site for HIWATT'S new home, a converted bakery complex in an old building that was located in a small industrial section of town known as ParkWorks.

Building the team

Mike Allen and Danny Edwardson were brought on board to improve upon the current crop of speaker cabinets that were currently being produced in the U.K. The first step was to use a more robust and acoustically sound material for the cabinets construction. This came in the form of 14-ply Baltic Birch, a much heavier and denser wood product than most of the other amplifier manufacturers of the day were using. Next, the cabinets were internally braced at no less than 9 points, and the construction was finished using tongue- and-groove joints. The cabinets were finished off with the most resilient and "classic-style" vinyl covering Reeves could find (made by Brymor Ltd.) and the "tough as nails" black, white & grey fret cloth (speaker cloth) covering that was distinctively HIWATT.

To put the cabinets into a small production stage, Reeves enlisted the services of Henry Glass and Co., known as BEESKIT, one of the U.K.'s premier cabinet builders. Henry's meticulous production techniques were a perfect complement to HIWATT'S already legendary road-worthiness, and Reeves fanatical approach to building nothing less than the ultimate guitar amplifier.

Another integral member that was added to the team at Hylight Electronics was Phil Dudderidge, whose specialty was the design and manufacture of public address systems. Phil's knowledge and extensive expertise in working with most of the major acts in Europe at the time, made him the perfect choice to expand the HIWATT name into the realm of sound reinforcement. Soon HIWATT would become almost as well known for their P.A. gear as they were for their guitar amplifiers. Phil went on to form Soundcraft with Graham Blyth.

The design of the amplifiers changed bit by bit through the 1970s, reflecting changing tastes within the industry. Some odd designs briefly surfaced during this period, including the "SAP" model with footswitch and the mysterious DR118. The use of printed circuit boards was started at the end of the 1970s.

Also during this time, some custom amplifiers were produced by Hiwatt for their most famous clients, including Pete Townshend's CP103 (a recreation of the early Sound City-era Hiwatt design) and David Gilmour's linked-input models.

The company changes hands

In early 1981, Dave Reeves died after falling down a flight of steps. Control of the company fell into the hands of solicitors, although his stated intention had been for his three children to inherit the business. Mary Clifford, the admin for the company at the time, along with other existing employees formed Biacrown Ltd., and continued making Hiwatt amplifiers. There were some minor innovations to the circuitry produced during this time, including the "OL" (overload) model which had an extra gain stage added. Some were labelled  "OL", while many were not. Some had an additional gain control added to the front panel labeled "overdrive".

Technical

Classic Hiwatt circuits

Input stage variations:

 The early input circuit version (Input 1) used a traditional resistive mixer to combine the two input channels. Half of V2 went unused.
 The later input circuit (Input 2), used both halves of V2 to do the input channel mixing.
 The OL and LEAD input circuits (Input 3) went back to the resistive mixer, and used the second half of V2 as an additional gain stage. These can be easily recognized by the "flying" components on the V2 socket.
  
Phase Inverter (PI) Variations:

 The earlier circuit (PI 1) used a cathode-follower directly connected to the PI circuit to both set the DC level and buffer the signal.
 The middle and later units (PI 2) capacitively coupled the last preamp stage to the PI. The former cathode follower section now has its input connected to a DC voltage divider, and is used strictly as a low impedance voltage reference.

Combination I: 
The earliest DRs with 4-inputs used Input 1 and PI 1.

Combination II:
At some point, the circuit was changed to use Input 1 and PI 2 (this version is represented by the Audio Bros and Hiwatt.com schematics). Some 4-inputs may have been made this way.

Combination III:
Finally, the circuit was changed to use Input 2 and PI 2. This change was definitely in all the 2-input heads, and is represented by the widely circulated freehand-drawn schematics in Pittman and elsewhere.

The OL Model (early 1980s):
Biacrown's "high gain" model moved back to the Input 1 circuit (still keeping PI 2), but used the "extra" half triode as an additional gain stage.

The LEAD Model (early 1980s):
This was basically the same as the OL model, but with an extra level control after the extra gain stage, which was marked "Overdrive" on the front panel.

DR103 amplifier

See also
 The Who's influence on musical equipment

References

External links 
 Hiwatt.org Hiwatt history and technical information
 TheWho.net page documenting Pete Townshend's transition from Sound City amps to Hiwatt

Guitar amplifier manufacturers
Manufacturing companies based in London
Audio equipment manufacturers of the United Kingdom